Spokane, Portland and Seattle Railway No. 6 was the only locomotive in Class A-2. Purchased from the Northern Pacific Railway for  A. B. Hammond's Astoria and Columbia River Railway, number 6 came to the SP&S secondhand. It was used as a switch locomotive until 1931 when it was sold to the St Helens Terminal and Dock Co. at St. Helens Oregon.

Background 
The Astoria and Columbia River (A&CR) ran from Astoria to Goble, Oregon, where the A&CR met the Northern Pacific. In 1907 the NP purchased the A&CR to be a feeder line for the new Spokane, Portland and Seattle Railway. To help the new feeder line handle increasing freight traffic, an NP Switcher was sold to the A&CR on August 7, 1907. The SP&S took over the A&CR and on February 24, 1911, obtained all A&CR locomotives. The former A&CR switch locomotive number 1 became SP&S number 6.

Construction history 
Number 6 was built for the Northern Pacific by Baldwin Locomotive Works in 1887. Its builder's number was 8617.

Operational history 
SP&S Number 6 continued with switching duties at Astoria, Oregon. On June 30, 1931 SP&S Number 6 was sold to the St. Helens Terminal and Dock Company.

Numbering 
Originally numbered NP 386, and then NP 988, the A&CR numbered NP 988 as A&CR Number 1. The SP&S renumbered A&CR 1 to SP&S Number 6.

Disposal 
SP&S Number 6 was sold to St. Helens Terminal & Dock Co (StHT&D Co). Grande Claims that Number 6 then "blew up and was scrapped." However he gives no dates for this. Gartner only states that when the SP&S bought the St.HT&D Co in 1933 that an SP&S locomotive (SP&S 201) had to be brought in.

Discrepancies 
Gartner and Grande differ on several dates. Grande gives a build date of 1897. He also states that the date SP&S No. 6 was sold to the StHT&D Co was 1921. Gartner gives dates of 1887 and 1931.

References 

 
 

Steam locomotives of the United States
A-2
0-6-0 locomotives
Baldwin locomotives
Railway locomotives introduced in 1887
Standard gauge locomotives of the United States
Shunting locomotives